Johann Bernhard Bach (23 May 1676 – 11 June 1749) was a German composer, and second cousin of J. S. Bach.

Life
Johann Bernhard Bach was born in Erfurt in 1676, in the house named "Zu den drei Rosen" (The Three Roses) on Junkersand Street, and was baptized on 25 November 1676 in Erfurt's Kaufmannskirche (Merchant's Church). He (like his younger brother Johann Christoph, born in 1685) received his early musical tuition from his father, Johann Aegidius Bach. After attending the Schola Mercatorum at Erfurt, he entered Erfurt's major secondary school at that time, the Ratsgymnasium. As early as 1695, at the age of 18, he became the organist at the Kaufmannskirche. In 1699, he moved to Magdeburg where he was appointed organist for St Catharine's Church. In 1703, John William III, Duke of Saxe-Eisenach called him to Eisenach to serve as harpsichordist at the ducal court. In Eisenach, he also became the organist at St George's Church, succeeding his uncle Johann Christoph Bach.

From 1708 to 1712, Johann Bernhard Bach worked together with Georg Philipp Telemann who held, first, the position of the leader of the violin section, and, from August 1709, that of a conductor (Kapellmeister) at Eisenach's ducal orchestra.

On 6 August 1716, Johann Bernhard Bach married Johanna Sophia Siefer. Three children were born into the family.

In 1741, the ducal orchestra was dissolved, which meant that Johann Bernhard continued to work exclusively as choirmaster and organist, until his death, apparently still receiving the ducal allowance of 100 Thalers per year.

Johann Bernhard kept a life-long friendship with his famous cousin Johann Sebastian Bach. In 1715, he acted as godfather for Johann Sebastian's son Johann Gottfried Bernhard, whilst Johann Sebastian became godfather to Johann Bernhard's eldest son Johann Ernst in 1722. This latter was to succeed his father Johann Bernhard as organist at St George's Church in Eisenach.

Bach died in 1749 at the age of 73

Work
Most of his musical output has been lost, but amongst his surviving music there are four orchestral suites. It is known that J.S. Bach had individual parts prepared for performance by his orchestra.

His musical style has been described as being similar to that of Telemann.

The surviving orchestral suites (overtures) are as follows:
Suite No. 1 in G minor
Suite No. 2 in G major
Suite No. 3 in E minor
Suite No. 4 in D major

They are thought to have been written before 1730.

Surviving keyboard music:
Fantasia in C minor (originally thought to have been composed by J.S. Bach as BWV 919)
Chaconne in A major
Chaconne in B-flat major
Chaconne in G major
Chorales for organ
"Du Friedefürst, Herr Jesu Christ"
"Nun freut euch lieben Christen g'mein"
"Vom Himmel hoch da komm ich her"

Two fugues composed by Johann Bernhard Bach also survive.

Discography
- "Ouvertures", Johann Bernhard Bach : L'Achéron / François Joubert-Caillet, Ricercar
- "Orchestral Suites - Johann Bernhard Bach", Johann Bernhard Bach, Thüringer Bach Collegium, audite Musikproduktion

Further reading 
 Siegfried Orth: Zu den Erfurter Jahren Johann Bernhard Bachs (1676-1749). in: Bach-Jahrbuch, 57, 1971, 
 Konrad Küster, Werner Breig, Günther Wagner, Ulrich Leisinger, Ulrike Feld, Peter Wollny, Ernest Warburton, Martin Geck/SL: Bach. in: MGG Online, edited by Laurenz Lütteken; Kassel, Stuttgart, New York: 2016ff., published initially 1999, online 2016 https://www.mgg-online.com/mgg/stable/12798

References

External links

  Johann Bernhard Bach on Bach Cantatas Website 

1676 births
1749 deaths
German Baroque composers
German male composers
German harpsichordists
Johann Bernhard Bach
Musicians from Erfurt
18th-century keyboardists
18th-century classical composers
18th-century German composers
18th-century German male musicians